The Girl in the Mirror is a Spanish supernatural thriller television series created by Sergio G. Sánchez for Netflix that premiered on 19 August 2022. The cast, led by Mireia Oriol, also features Álex Villazán, Pol Monen, Claudia Roset, Javier Morgade, Nil Cardoner, María Caballero, Milena Smit and Elena Irureta, among others.

Premise 
Following a bus crash, Alma—one of only a few survivors of the accident—wakes up in a hospital suffering from amnesia. Disoriented and traumatized, she tries to unravel the mystery behind the accident.

Cast

Production 
Netflix ordered the series in late 2018. Created by Sergio G. Sánchez, the screenplay was written by Sánchez alongside Teresa de Rosendo and Paul Pen, with Sánchez and Kike Maíllo directing. Produced by Sospecha Films for Netflix, shooting started in September 2020, taking place in different locations in Asturias, including Llanes, as well as in Manresa, Catalonia.

Release 
The series premiered on 19 August 2022 on Netflix.

Episodes

References 

2022 Spanish television series debuts
Spanish fantasy television series
Spanish horror fiction television series
Spanish thriller television series
Spanish-language television shows
Television shows filmed in Spain
Fiction about amnesia
2020s Spanish drama television series
Spanish-language Netflix original programming
2020s LGBT-related television series
Psychological thriller television series